James W. Porter may refer to:

James W. Porter (politician) (fl. 1940s), American politician from New York
James W. Porter (judge) (1887–1959), justice of the Idaho Supreme Court
James W. Porter (ecologist) (born 1946), American ecologist
James W. Porter II (born 1949), American lawyer and gun rights activist